This is a list of players named to participate in the netball tournament at the 2006 Commonwealth Games.

Group A

The following is the England roster in the netball tournament of the 2006 Commonwealth Games.

The following is the Fiji roster in the netball tournament of the 2006 Commonwealth Games.

The following is the Malawi roster in the netball tournament of the 2006 Commonwealth Games.

The following is the New Zealand roster in the netball tournament of the 2006 Commonwealth Games.

The following is the Saint Vincent and the Grenadines roster in the netball tournament of the 2006 Commonwealth Games.

The following is the South Africa roster in the netball tournament of the 2006 Commonwealth Games.

Group B

The following is the Australia roster in the netball tournament of the 2006 Commonwealth Games.

The following is the Barbados roster in the netball tournament of the 2006 Commonwealth Games.

The following is the Jamaica roster in the netball tournament of the 2006 Commonwealth Games.

The following is the Samoa roster in the netball tournament of the 2006 Commonwealth Games.

The following is the Singapore roster in the netball tournament of the 2006 Commonwealth Games.

The following is the Wales roster in the netball tournament of the 2006 Commonwealth Games.

References

 
Lists of netball players